Richard Henry Norton (November 6, 1849 – March 15, 1918) was a U.S. Representative from Missouri.

Born in Troy, Missouri, Norton attended the common schools and Saint Louis University, where he took a classical course.
He graduated from the law school of Washington University in St. Louis in 1870.
He was admitted to the bar and commenced practice in Troy, Missouri.

Norton was elected as a Democrat to the Fifty-first and Fifty-second Congresses (March 4, 1889 – March 3, 1893).
He was an unsuccessful candidate for reelection in 1892 to the Fifty-third Congress.
He resumed the practice of law and also engaged in agricultural pursuits.

He died in St. Louis, Missouri, March 15, 1918.
He was interred in City Cemetery, Troy, Missouri.

References

1849 births
1918 deaths
Washington University School of Law alumni
Democratic Party members of the United States House of Representatives from Missouri
19th-century American politicians
People from Troy, Missouri
Saint Louis University alumni